Joey Valenti (born August 29, 1966) is a retired American soccer midfielder who played on the U.S. team at the 1985 FIFA U-16 World Championship.

Valenti attended A. P. Leto High School in Tampa, Florida where he was a 1986 Parade Magazine High School All American soccer player.   Valenti and his team mates won the 1985 Florida State 4A soccer championship.  In 1985, he was selected to play for the U.S. at the 1985 FIFA U-16 World Championship.    Valenti and his team mates went 1-2 in the group stage and did not qualify for the second round.  In 1986, he entered Duke University, playing for the Blue Devils' men's soccer team from 1986 to 1989.  His freshman year, Duke won the NCAA Men's Soccer Championship and in 1988, Valenti was selected as a first team All American garnering second team honors in 1989.  In 1989, Valenti was the 1989 National Challenge Cup MVP as his team, the St. Petersburg Kickers took the title.  In 1992, Valenti signed with the Greensboro Dynamo of the USISL, playing for them in 1992 and 1993.  In the summer of  1993, Valenti played three games with the Tampa Bay Rowdies of the American Professional Soccer League.  He then returned to the Dynamo, now known as the Carolina Dynamo, playing with them until 1995.  Valenti played 48 games, scoring 3 goals, over his four seasons with the Dynamo.

References

External links
 

1968 births
All-American men's college soccer players
American Professional Soccer League players
American soccer players
North Carolina Fusion U23 players
Duke Blue Devils men's soccer players
Parade High School All-Americans (boys' soccer)
St. Petersburg Kickers players
Tampa Bay Rowdies (1975–1993) players
USISL players
Living people
United States men's youth international soccer players
Association football midfielders
Soccer players from Tampa, Florida